The 1942–43 Wisconsin Badgers men's basketball team represented University of Wisconsin–Madison. The head coach was Harold E. Foster, coaching his ninth season with the Badgers. The team played their home games at the UW Fieldhouse in Madison, Wisconsin and was a member of the Big Ten Conference.

Schedule

|-
!colspan=12| Regular Season

References

Wisconsin Badgers men's basketball seasons
Wisconsin
Wisconsin Badger
Wisconsin Badger